The 2020–21 Cayman Islands Premier League was the 42nd season of the Cayman Islands Premier League, the top division football competition in the Cayman Islands. The season began on 25 September 2020 and concluded on 28 February 2021. Bodden Town were the defending champions from the previous season. Following the previous season, two teams, Alliance FC and North Side SC were relegated to the First Division, reducing the number of teams in the league to ten. On 13 February, Scholars clinched the league championship, their 13th title.

League table

Clubs' stadiums

References

2020–21
2020–21 in Caribbean football leagues